The predecessor of USACycling, the Amateur Bicycle League of America (ABLA) was founded in 1921 and held National Championships starting that year. From 1921 to 1964, these championships were four-event 
omnium of track-style events,
rather than a road race. USACycling souvenir programs list no results for events in 1931-1934, 1938, and 1942-1944. The 1939 program summarizes the 1937 National Champions. The 1938 results are from a 
national championship with similar events and format that the Amateur Athletic Union promoted.

Amateur Men

Amateur Women
First held in 1937.

Juniors

Formats
 1923 Senior and Junior Men rode 1/3 mile , 1 mile , 5 mile unpaced, and 10  mile. 
 1924 Senior Men rode 1/3 mile (in heats), 1 mile (in heats), 5 mile unpaced, and 10  mile. Junior men rode 1/4 mile (in heats), 1/3 mile (in heats) 1 mile (unpaced), and 2 mile. 
 1938 Senior Men rode three events: 1 mile, 5 mile, 10 mile. A 25 mile points race was run but was not part of the championship omnium.
 1939 Senior Men rode four events: 1 mile (in heats), 5 mile, 10 mile points race, 25 mile points race.
 1946 Senior men rode four events: 1 mile (in heats), 5 mile, 10 mile points race, 25 mile points race.
 1947 Senior Men rode 1 mile, 5 mile, 10 mile races, 25 mile points race. 
 1948 Senior Men rode 0.5 mile, 1 mile, 5 mile, 10 mile races. The 1, 2, and 5 mile races ran in heats. The format of the 10 mile race was not listed.
 1949 Senior Men rode 0.5 mile, 1 mile, 5 mile, 10 mile races. The 1, 2, and 5 mile races ran in heats. The format of the 10 mile race was not listed.
 1950 Senior Men rode 1 mile, 2 mile, 5 mile, 10 mile points races. The 1, 2, and 5 mile races ran in heats. 
 1952 Senior Men rode 1 mile, 2 mile, 5 mile, 10 mile points races. The 1, 2, and 5 mile races ran in heats.
 1953 Senior Men rode 1 mile, 3 mile, 5 mile, 25 mile points race. The 1, 3, and 5 mile races ran in heats.
 1954 Senior Men rode 0.5 mile, 1 mile, 5 mile, and 10 mile. The 0.5 mile, 1 mile, and 5 mile races ran in heats. The format of the 10 mile race was not listed.
 1956 Senior Men rode 1 mile, 2 mile, 5 mile,  and 10 mile points race. The 1 mile and 2 mile races ran in heats.
 1957 Senior Men rode 1 mile, 2 mile, 5 mile,  and 10 mile points race.  
 1962 Senior Men rode 1000 m time trial, 4000 m pursuit, 0.5 mile, 10 mile points race. The 4000 m pursuit, 0.5 mile ran in heats  
 1964 Senior Men rode 1000 m time trial, 4000 m pursuit, 1000 m sprints, 10 mile scratch race. Juniors: 1/2 mile, 1 mile, 2 miles, 5 miles. Women: 1/2 mile, 1 mile, 2 miles.
Formats taken from National Championship programs unless otherwise noted.

Notes

1921 establishments in Washington, D.C.
1964 disestablishments in New York (state)
Cycle races in the United States
Defunct cycling races in the United States
National road cycling championships
Recurring sporting events disestablished in 1964
Recurring sporting events established in 1921
1964 disestablishments in the United States